James Williams was the co-owner of the Cincinnati Reds baseball team of the National League from  through  with his brother William Williams.  They sold the Reds to Marge Schott in 1984.

References
Cincinnati Reds timeline

Major League Baseball executives
Cincinnati Reds executives
Cincinnati Reds owners
Year of birth missing
Year of death missing